Cantharellus californicus, sometimes called the mud puppy or oak chanterelle, is a fungus native to California, United States. It is a member of the genus Cantharellus along with other popular edible chanterelles. Their unusual size is due in part to their capacity for indeterminate growth, making Cantharellus californicus specimens actively grow for far longer than most other mushrooms.

Description

The hymenium is folded into decurrent ridges (false gills) and cross-veins, which deepen with age. The color of these ridges is usually similar to the pileus but paler. The spores are creamy yellow, elliptical, and smooth.

Distribution and habitat
Cantharellus californicus forms a mycorrhizal association with oaks, particularly coast live oak in the woodlands of Coastal California.  It has also been found in association with interior live oak, California black oak, canyon live oak, tanoak, and possibly Pacific madrone and manzanita.  C. californicus is a popular wild edible in the San Francisco Bay Area, and is most common between November and April.

Similar species

Several other species of chanterelle may be found in western North America:
C. cascadensis — bright yellow fading to white in center of cap, associated with conifers
C. cibarius var. roseocanus — false gills tend to be as dark or darker than cap
C. formosus — smaller size, narrower stem, associated with conifers
C. subalbidus — whitish overall color

Additionally, Hygrophoropsis aurantiaca, Chroogomphus tomentosus, and species in the genera Craterellus, Gomphus, Omphalotus, and Polyozellus may have a somewhat similar appearance to C. californicus.  Omphalotus olivascens, the western jack-o'-lantern mushroom, is poisonous and has been mistaken for chanterelles.

References

External links

californicus
Fungi of California
Edible fungi
Food and drink in California
Fungi described in 2008
Fungi without expected TNC conservation status